Robert Bagley Foster (February 22, 1891 – August 25, 1960) was an American swimmer. He competed in the men's 100 metre freestyle at the 1908 Summer Olympics.

On June 11, 1913, Foster married Josephine Pontius Ramsey. Among their children are David Ramsey Foster, a decorated pilot in the British Royal Navy during World War II and business executive, and Phoebe Louise Foster, who married Lieutenant Osbert Stephen Boothby, the son of Commander William Osbert Boothby MVO RN.

References

External links
 

1891 births
1960 deaths
American male swimmers
Olympic swimmers of the United States
Swimmers at the 1908 Summer Olympics
Swimmers from Chicago